The Puppetry Art Center of Taipei (PACT) is an arts center in Songshan District, Taipei, Taiwan.

History
In 1998, Lin Ching-fu, chairperson of the Taiyuan Arts and Culture Foundation, donated his personal collection of puppets which he had been collecting over years to Taipei City Government. The center was then planned by the Department of Cultural Affairs of the city government. The center was eventually opened on 7 August 2004.

Architecture
The center is divided into four areas, which are glove puppets, string puppets, shadow puppets and interactive games.

Activities
The center regularly holds puppet shows and educational puppetry classes, including puppet making workshop.

Transportation
The center is accessible within walking distance southwest of Nanjing Sanmin Station of Taipei Metro.

See also
 List of tourist attractions in Taiwan

References

External links
 

2004 establishments in Taiwan
Art centers in Taipei
Event venues established in 2004